Kuldip Chand Agnihotri (born in 1951) was Vice Chancellor of Central University of Himachal Pradesh. He is eminent academician and member of various academic bodies.

Education
Agnihotri completed his B.Sc. from Sikh National College. He did his MA from Khalsa College, Layalpur, Jalandhar. He obtained his Ph.D. degree from Punjab University, Chandigarh.

Books

References

Living people
Academic staff of the Central University of Himachal Pradesh
1951 births